Sum most commonly means the total of two or more numbers added together; see addition.

Sum can also refer to:

Mathematics 

 Sum (category theory), the generic concept of summation in mathematics
 Sum, the result of summation, the addition of a sequence of numbers
 3SUM, a term from computational complexity theory
 Band sum, a way of connecting mathematical knots
 Connected sum, a way of gluing manifolds
 Digit sum, in number theory
 Direct sum, a combination of algebraic objects
 Direct sum of groups
 Direct sum of modules
 Direct sum of permutations
 Direct sum of topological groups
 Einstein summation, a way of contracting tensor indices
 Empty sum, a sum with no terms
 Indefinite sum, the inverse of a finite difference
 Kronecker sum, an operation considered a kind of addition for matrices
 Matrix addition, in linear algebra
 Minkowski addition, a sum of two subsets of a vector space
 Power sum symmetric polynomial, in commutative algebra
 Prefix sum, in computing
 Pushout (category theory) (also called an amalgamated sum or a cocartesian square, fibered coproduct, or fibered sum), the colimit of a diagram consisting of two morphisms f : Z → X and g : Z → Y with a common domainor pushout, leading to a fibered sum in category theory
 QCD sum rules, in quantum field theory
 Riemann sum, in calculus
 Rule of sum, in combinatorics
 Subset sum problem, in cryptography
 Sum rule in differentiation, in calculus
 Sum rule in integration, in calculus
 Sum rule in quantum mechanics
 Wedge sum, a one-point union of topological spaces
 Whitney sum, of fiber bundles
 Zero-sum problem in combinatorics

Computing and technology
 Sum (Unix), a program for generating checksums
 StartUp-Manager, a program to configure GRUB, GRUB2, Usplash and Splashy
 Sum type, a computer science term

Art and entertainment
 Sum, the first beat (pronounced like "some") in any rhythmic cycle of Hindustani classical music
 "Sum", a song by Pink Floyd from The Endless River
 Sum: Forty Tales from the Afterlives, a 2009 collection of short stories by David Eagleman
 Sum 41, a Canadian punk band
 SUM, the computer in Goat Song (novelette) story by Poul Anderson in Magazine of Fantasy and Science Fiction, (1972).

Organizations
 Senter for utvikling og miljø (Centre for Development and the Environment), a research institute which is part of the University of Oslo
 Soccer United Marketing, the for-profit marketing arm of Major League Soccer and the exclusive marketing partner of the United States Soccer Federation
 Society for the Establishment of Useful Manufactures, a now-defunct private state-sponsored corporation founded in 1791 to promote industrial development along the Passaic River in New Jersey in the United States
 The State University of Management, a Russian university
 Save Uganda Movement, a Ugandan militant opposition group

Places
 Sum (administrative division), an administrative division in Mongolia, China and some areas of Russia
 Sum (Mongolia), an administrative division in Mongolia
 SUM, the IATA airport code for the Sumter Airport in Sumter County, South Carolina, USA

Other uses
 Sum, an old name for the Finns in East Slavic languages, derived from the word Suomi, "Finland"
 Soum (currency) (also spelled "sum"), a unit of currency used in some Turkic-speaking countries of Central Asia
 SUM (interbank network), an interbank network in 42 U.S. states
 SUM, the ISO 639-3 code for the Sumo language
 Cen (surname), sometimes Romanized Sum
 Cogito, ergo sum,  Latin for: "I think, therefore I am"
 Sum certain, a legal term

See also
Addition
 Additive category 
 Preadditive category